Advanced Materials Interfaces is a peer-reviewed scientific journal covering materials science, including research on functional interfaces and surfaces and their specific applications.

Abstracting and indexing
The journal is abstracted and indexed in:
Chemical Abstracts Service
Current Contents/Physical, Chemical & Earth Sciences
Scopus
Science Citation Index Expanded

According to the Journal Citation Reports, the journal has a 2021 impact factor of 6.389, ranking it 48th out of 179 journals in the category "Chemistry, Multidisciplinary" and 95th out of 345 journals in the category "Materials Science, Multidisciplinary".

References

External links

Wiley-VCH academic journals
Materials science journals
English-language journals
Biweekly journals
Publications established in 2014